The Southern Bantu languages are a large group of Bantu languages, largely validated in Janson (1991/92). They are nearly synonymous with Guthrie's Bantu zone S, apart from the exclusion of Shona and the inclusion of Makhuwa. They include all of the major Bantu languages of South Africa, Botswana, Lesotho, Eswatini, and Mozambique, with outliers such as Lozi in Zambia and Namibia, and Ngoni in Zambia, Tanzania and Malawi.

Languages
Language groups are followed by their code in the Guthrie classification. 
Makua (P30)
Makhuwa 
Koti
Sakati (Nathembo)
Lomwe
Chuwabu
Moniga
Chopi (S60)
Chopi
Guitonga 
Nguni languages (S40)
Zunda
Xhosa
Zulu
Ndebele 
Northern Ndebele (Zimbabwe Ndebele)
Southern Ndebele
Tekela
Swati
Phuthi
Sumayela Ndebele (Northern Transvaal Ndebele)
Lala
Bhaca
Hlubi
Nhlangwini
Sotho–Tswana (S30 + K20): 
Tswana ("West Sotho")
Birwa
Tswapong
Kgalagadi
Sotho
Northern Sotho (Sepedi)
Southern Sotho (Sesotho)
East Sotho (Pulana, Khutswe and Pai)
Lozi
Tswa–Ronga (S50): 
Tsonga
Ronga
Tswa
Venda (S20)

Some classifications prior to Janson retained Shona as a coordinate branch, along with Nyasa, or excluded Makua.

References